Caney can refer to the following places in the United States:
Caney, Hopkins County, Texas
Caney, Matagorda County, Texas
New Caney, Texas